Amos Guttman (May 10, 1954 – February 16, 1993) was an Israeli film director, born in Romania. He directed the first ever Israeli LGBT-themed film and most of his films were based on events that happened in his own personal life.

Biography
Guttman was born in Sita Buzăului, district of Covasna, in Transylvania, Romania and emigrated to Israel at the age of seven with his family. He studied film at Beit Zvi. Between 1975 and 1982, Guttman directed three short films: A Safe Place, Returning Premiers, and Drifting. In 1983, he directed his feature debut, Drifting (no relation to the earlier short film). He then directed three other feature films: Bar 51 (1985), Himmo, King of Jerusalem (1987), and Amazing Grace (1992).

Guttman was an overtly gay man, and most of his films—except Himmo, King of Jerusalem, a film about the 1947–1949 Palestine war, based on a story by Yoram Kaniuk—explored aspects of life for LGBT individuals, including AIDS, which was the subject of his last film, Amazing Grace. Many Israeli actors made breakthrough performances in Guttman's films, including Jonathan Sagall, Alon Abutbul, Sharon Alexander, Aki Avni, and Rivka Michaeli.

Guttman was part of a group of young Israeli directors who called for quality films at the expense of commercial cinema. While he was an active director, He created a rich and stylish cinematic language, providing a unique sound. His films were notable for his attention to the visual and his distinct content.

Death
Guttman died in Tel Aviv on February 16, 1993, of AIDS at the age of 38. He was buried at Kiryat Shaul Cemetery in Tel Aviv. Even after his death, Guttman remains among the most influential people in Israel’s LGBT community. The 2013 film Snails in the Rain, directed by Yariv Mozer, is dedicated to his memory.

Filmography

Cinema
Drifting (1975) - Short film
Returning Premiers (1976) - Short film
A Safe Place (1977) - Short film
Drifting (1983)
Bar 51 (1985)
Himmo, King of Jerusalem (1988)
Amazing Grace (1992)

References

External links

1954 births
1993 deaths
Film people from Tel Aviv
People from Covasna County
Beit Zvi School for the Performing Arts alumni
Israeli film directors
Israeli film producers
Israeli male screenwriters
LGBT film directors
LGBT film producers
Gay Jews
Israeli gay writers
Israeli LGBT screenwriters
Romanian LGBT writers
Gay screenwriters
Jewish Israeli writers
Romanian Jews in Israel
Israeli people of Romanian-Jewish descent
Romanian emigrants to Israel
20th-century Israeli Jews
20th-century Romanian Jews
Transylvanian Jews
AIDS-related deaths in Israel
Burials at Kiryat Shaul Cemetery
20th-century Israeli screenwriters
20th-century Israeli LGBT people